Kuli Faletau (born 30 December 1963) is a Tongan former international rugby union player who played as a lock. He is Tonga's most capped forward.

Career
Faletau played as a lock, and played in 20 tests for Tonga between 1988 and 1999, scoring 2 tries and 9 points.

He also appeared at the 1999 Rugby World Cup.

Faletau played at club level for Tonmawr, Toa-ko-ma'afu, Ebbw Vale and Pontypool.

Personal life
He is the father of Welsh international Taulupe Faletau. He also has two other sons, and is a lay preacher in Wales.

References

1963 births
Living people
Tongan rugby union players
Tonga international rugby union players
Tongan expatriate rugby union players
Expatriate rugby union players in Wales
Tongan expatriate sportspeople in Wales
Rugby union locks
People from Nukuʻalofa